Rogers Township is one of twelve townships in Ford County, Illinois, USA.  As of the 2010 census, its population was 449 and it contained 208 housing units.  It was formed as Grant Township from a portion of Stockton (Brenton) Township in September, 1863; its name was changed to Rogers Township on May 9, 1864.

Geography

Cities, towns, villages
 Cabery (south half)
 Kempton (north quarter)

Unincorporated towns
 Stelle

Cemeteries
The township contains Saint Joseph Cemetery.

Major highways
  Illinois Route 115

Demographics

School districts
 Tri Point Community Unit School District 6-J

Political districts
 Illinois' 15th congressional district
 State House District 105
 State Senate District 53

References
 
 United States Census Bureau 2007 TIGER/Line Shapefiles
 United States National Atlas

External links
 City-Data.com
 Illinois State Archives

Townships in Ford County, Illinois
Townships in Illinois